Donald Vincent Burke (February 7, 1926 – August 10, 2009) was an American football linebacker who played in the National Football League (NFL) for the San Francisco 49ers from 1950 to 1954 for a total of 39 games. He played college football as a fullback at USC.

References

External links
 

1926 births
2009 deaths
American football linebackers
San Francisco 49ers players
USC Trojans football players
Sportspeople from Chico, California
Players of American football from Oakland, California